A cerebral activator, or cerebral metabolic enhancer, is a type of drug that "activates" the central nervous system in the context of cerebrovascular diseases such as stroke and dementia. The term has been used specifically to describe a few Japanese drugs, such as indeloxazine and bifemelane.

References

Neuroprotective agents